The European Communities (Amendment) Act 1986 (c. 58) is an Act of the Parliament of the United Kingdom which saw the first major amendment to the European Communities Act 1972 since the UK first joined the European Communities some thirteen years earlier to include the provisions that was agreed in the Single European Act which was signed on 17 and 28 February 1986 and be incorporated into the domestic law of the United Kingdom  It was given Royal assent on 7 November 1986.

The Act was repealed by the European Union (Withdrawal) Act 2018 on 31 January 2020.

See also
 Acts of Parliament of the United Kingdom relating to the European Communities and the European Union
 European Economic Area
 European single market

Acts of the Parliament of the United Kingdom relating to the European Union
United Kingdom Acts of Parliament 1986
Euroscepticism in the United Kingdom